The 2017–18 season was UD Almería's twentieth seventh season of existence and the third consecutive in Segunda División.

Squad

Coaches

Staff members

Source: UD Almería's official website

Transfers

In

Total spending:  €70,000

Out

Total gaining:  €2,200,000

Balance
Total:  €2,130,000

Contracts

Player statistics

Squad statistics 

 

|-
|colspan="12"|Players on loan to other clubs:
|-
|colspan="12"|Players who have left the club after the start of the season:

|}

Top scorers

Disciplinary record

Competitions

Pre-season/Friendlies

Segunda División

Results summary

Results by round

Matches

Copa del Rey

References

Almeria
UD Almería seasons
2017–18 Segunda División